The Medici column is a monument in Paris, France, located in front of the Bourse de commerce. It has been listed since 1862 as a monument historique by the French Ministry of Culture, and is the only remnant of the former Hôtel de Soissons.

History

The column was built in 1575 by Jean Bullant at the request of Catherine de' Medici. It is believed it may be a tribute to Henri II, who was killed after a prediction was made by Nostradamus. Catherine also had a love for astrology and when Nostradamus left Paris, she asked to have the column built so that Cosimo Ruggieri could use it.

Description

The fluted column is 28 meters high. Inside are 147 spiral steps which lead to a viewing platform. It used to have a glass roof. Now the platform is covered with an iron frame. The four corners of the columns top match the four points of a compass. The column was not an original part of the plan when Catherine de' Medici was planning the building of her home, Hôtel de Soissons, to which the column connected.

Location

References

Monuments historiques of Paris
Buildings and structures completed in 1575
Monumental columns in France
Monuments and memorials in Paris
House of Medici
History of astrology
Buildings and structures in the 1st arrondissement of Paris
Catherine de' Medici